John Bennett may refer to:

Arts and entertainment
John Bennett (actor) (1928–2005), British actor
John Bennett (composer) (c. 1735–1784), British composer and organist
John Bennett (drummer), drummer of the UK doom metal band The Prophecy
John Bennett (OITNB), fictional prison guard in Orange Is The New Black
John Bennett (potter) (1840–1907), British ceramic artist
John Bennett, American trombonist, founding member of Kenny Ball and his Jazzmen
Johnny Bennett (born 1998), British actor

Military
John A. Bennett (1936–1961), the last person executed by the US military
John Bradbury Bennet (sometimes misspelled Bennett, 1865–1930), American Army brigadier general
John Bennett, Royal Navy recipient of the Ushalov Medal for his role in the Second World War Arctic convoys

Politics
John Benett (1773–1852), British Member of Parliament for South Wiltshire
John Bennett (fl. 1586–1589), MP for Heytesbury and Westbury
John Bennett (Australian politician) (1942–2019), Tasmanian politician
John Bennett (Canadian politician) (1832–1912), Ontario farmer and political figure
John Bennett (English barrister) (c. 1658–1723), British politician
John Bennett (Irish politician) (c. 1720–1792), Irish politician, barrister and judge
John Bennett (Victorian politician) (1824–1859), lawyer and politician in colonial Victoria
John Bennett (watchmaker) (1814–1897), watchmaker and briefly Sheriff of London
John B. Bennett (1904–1964), U.S. Representative from Michigan
John D. Bennett (1911–2005), New York politician and judge
John E. Bennett (judge) (1833–1893), Arkansas Supreme Court Justice and South Dakota Supreme Court Justice
John J. Bennett Jr. (1894–1967), American lawyer and politician
John O. Bennett (born 1948), New Jersey state senator and acting governor (for 4 days) 
John R. Bennett (fl. 2010s), Oklahoma politician
John Robert Bennett (1866–1941), Newfoundland politician
John Bennet (judge) (1553–1627), English judge and politician

Religion
John C. Bennett (1804–1867), American physician and leader in the Latter Day Saint movement
John George Bennett (1891–1957), American clergyman of the Roman Catholic Church
John P. Bennett (1914–2011), Arawak priest and linguist

Science and medicine
John Caister Bennett (1914–1990), South African astronomer
John E. Bennett (scientist) (born 1933), American physician-scientist
John G. Bennett (1897–1974), British mathematician, scientist, technologist, industrial research director, mystic and author 
John Hughes Bennett (1812–1875), English physician, physiologist and pathologist
John Joseph Bennett (1801–1876), British botanist
John Makepeace Bennett (1921–2010), Australian pioneer of computer science
John Whitchurch Bennett (1790–1853), British army officer and naturalist

Sport
John Bennett (athlete) (born 1930), American long jumper, Olympic silver medal winner (1956)
John Bennett (Australian footballer) (born 1960), Australian rules footballer
John Bennett (cricketer, born 1777) (1777–1857), English cricketer
John Bennett (cricketer, born 1864) (1864–1928), English cricketer
John Bennett (diver) (1959–2004), first scuba diver beyond 1,000 feet
John Bennett (field hockey) (1885–1973), British Olympic field hockey player
John Bennett (footballer, born 1946), former professional footballer in England
John Bennett (footballer, born 1949), former footballer in England
John Bennett (hurler) (1934–2016), Irish hurler
John Bennett (ice hockey) (born 1950), retired American ice hockey left winger
Jon Bennett (racing driver) (born 1965), American racing driver
Jack Bennett (rugby league), English rugby league footballer of the 1920s and 1930s

Writing
John Bennett (author) (1865–1956), author and illustrator of children's books
John M. Bennett (born 1942), American poet

Other
John Bennett (educator) (born 1948), Australian education administrator
John Bennett (watchmaker) (1814–1897), watchmaker and local politician
John Cyril Bennett (1891–1957), British-born, US-based architect
John G. Bennett (1883–1929), Kansas City resident and victim of the Bridge Murder case
John Tuson Bennett (1937–2013), Australian solicitor and legal historian involved in Holocaust denial
John Wheeler-Bennett (1902–1975), English historian of German and diplomatic history
John W. F. Bennett (c. 1875–1943), American civil engineer and football player

See also
John Bennet (disambiguation)
Jack Bennett (disambiguation)
Jonathan Bennett (disambiguation)
Bennett (name)